A by-product or byproduct is a secondary product derived from a production process, manufacturing process or chemical reaction; it is not the primary product or service being produced.

A by-product can be useful and marketable or it can be considered waste: for example, bran, which is a byproduct of the milling of wheat into refined flour, is sometimes composted or burned for disposal, but in other cases, it can be used as a nutritious ingredient in human food or animal feed. Gasoline was once a byproduct of oil refining that later became a desirable commodity as motor fuel. The plastic used in plastic shopping bags also started as a by-product of oil refining.

In economics 
In the context of production, a by-product is the "output from a joint production process that is minor in quantity and/or net realizable value (NRV) when compared with the main products". Because they are deemed to have no influence on reported financial results, by-products do not receive allocations of joint costs. By-products also, by convention, are not inventoried, but the NRV from by-products is typically recognized as "other income", or as a reduction of joint production processing costs when the by-product is produced.

The International Energy Agency (IEA) defines by-product in the context of life-cycle assessment by defining four different product types: "main products, co-products (which involve similar revenues to the main product), by-products (which result in smaller revenues), and waste products (which provide little or no revenue)."

In chemistry 
While some chemists treat "by-product" and "side-product" as synonyms in the above sense of a generic secondary (untargeted) product, others find it useful to distinguish between the two. When the two terms are distinguished, "by-product" is used to refer to a product that is not desired but inevitably results from molecular fragments of starting materials and/or reagents that are not incorporated into the desired product, as a consequence of conservation of mass; in contrast, "side-product" is used to refer to a product that is formed from a competitive process that could, in principle, be suppressed by an optimization of reaction conditions.

Common byproducts
bagasse and molasses from sugar production
bran and germ from flour milling
buttermilk from butter production
distillers grains from ethanol production
fly ash and bottom ash from coal combustion
glycerol from soap or biodiesel production
lanolin from wool processing
lees from wine fermentation
pomace fruit juice or olive oil production
saw dust from lumber production
slag from smelting ore
straw from grain harvesting
trub from beer fermentation
vinasse from  sugar or ethanol production
whey from cheese production

See also 
 Main product
 By-product synergy
 Circular economy
 Side reaction

References 

Recycling